Victoria Hotspurs Football Club is a Maltese football club from the town of Victoria, Gozo. Founded in 1948, the club has won a record of 13 First Division titles, the last one being in the 2018–19 season. In 2000, when they won their tenth title, they became the first club to be awarded a Golden Star for Sport Excellence. 
The Club is popularly known by the Gozitans simply as il-Hotspurs, which literally means The Hotspurs.

History

Early Days
The Victoria Hotspurs Football Club was formed in December 1948 by Dr. Antoine Mercieca M.D. with the help of Mr. Gigi Xuereb and Mr. Alfred Attard.

The Club’s original name was Victoria Hotspur, since its first Club President, Dr. Antoine Mercieca M.D., was a fervent supporter of Tottenham Hotspur, an English football club in London that competes in the Premier League. 
Nicknamed The Hospitals, Victoria Hotspur had its first premises in the old Gozo Hospital in St. Francis Square, Victoria. The first three matches were played with players wearing brand new white shirts borrowed from the Gozo Hospital. Later on, red shirts with white sleeves, together with white shorts, were bought from the sister island of Malta.
Victoria Hotspurs Football Club played its first friendly match against the Salesian Youths, losing 1–2. Its first official Gozo Football League match was played against Ghajnsielem Rangers on 30 January 1948, with Victoria Hotspurs winning the game 2–1. After finishing second to Salesian Youths, Victoria Hotspurs won their first Galea Cup after defeating RAF(Gozo) 6–1.

Golden Days
The golden years for the club were between 1957–1970. Re-organized again in 1957, Victoria Hotspurs won the Second Division League, amongst others, such as the Dingli Cup, the Tapie Second Division and the MG Second Knock Out, in Season 1958 – 1959. 
In December 1959, Victoria Hotspurs had its first official club, which was better known as Tal-Luqa in St. Francis Square, Victoria.

In 1960, Victoria Hotspurs played their first friendly game in Sicily against Oratorio Salesiano San Gregorio, with the game ending 1–1. Joe Camilleri, the club’s longest serving captain, scored for the Hotspurs.
Victoria Hotspurs won its first League Championship in 1961–1962. After clinching the title, Victoria Hotspurs played a friendly game against the then Malta League Champions, Floriana F.C., on 3 June 1962, with the greens winning 4–3.
The season which took place between the years 1962–1963 commenced with Victoria Hotspurs winning the second Galea Cup and also the second League Championship. During this season, Vincent Grech was the first Victoria Hotspurs player to win the prestigious title of the Gozo Football Player of the Year.

Victoria Hotspurs won the Esso Cup for the first time in 1963–1964, yet lost the League Championship of the same season, Victoria Hotspurs played the last decisive game against Xaghra Young Stars, winning 4–0, but unfortunately the game was played with one linesman. Xaghra Young Stars filed a protest with the Gozo Football Association (GFA) and consequently, Victoria Hotspurs lost the replay 1–2. During this season Victoria Hotspurs won the first Reserves League.

The following year, 1964–1965, Victoria Hotspurs won the third League Championship and the first Independence Cup. Success followed, and during the season which took place between the years 1965–1966, Victoria Hotspurs won the fourth League Championship and the Esso Cup for the second time. Again, Victoria Hotspurs dominated the 1966–1967 season, winning the fifth League Championship and the third Esso Cup.
Victoria Hotspurs also won their third Galea Cup during season 1968–1969.

The Seventies
Although Victoria Hotspurs were very close to winning the League Championship during the season 1973–1974, the Club did not manage to win any trophy during the seventies. Despite this, in October 1977, Victoria Hotspurs was the first Gozitan team to win against a foreign football team in the Silver Jubilee Ground.  Victoria Hotspurs winning 2–1 against Awras, a Libyan First Division team from Derna. Anton Sillato from the penalty spot and Tarcisio Galea scoring for the Hotspurs.

Champions Again
After an absence of several years, Victoria Hotspurs won their sixth League Championship in the season of 1979–1980. Under the guidelines of Dutch coach Albert Lemmen, the title was decided after winning a three games decider against Sannat Lions. Victoria Hotspurs won 1–0, with Tarcisio Galea scoring the winning goal.

Victoria Hotspurs won their first Republic Cup in 1980–1981 season after winning against rivals Sannat Lions. Victoria Hotspurs won the seventh League Championship in the season of 1984–1985. The then coach was Michael Camilleri, while player Dominic Grech was in charge of the training sessions. During this season, the latter won the title of Gozo Football Player of the year.

During the season of 1989–1990, ex-player Vincent Grech took over the role of Coach. Victoria Hotspurs won their first Super Cup during this season.

Following the first Super Cup, under the guidelines of Vincent Grech, Victoria Hotspurs won the eight League Championship during the 1990–1991 season after defeating Xewkija Tigers in a title decider, with Michael Cremona and Silvan Debono scoring for Victoria Hotspurs. Victoria Hotspurs won again the Super Cup during season 1990–1991 and 1991–1992.

The League Championship was back in Victoria during season 1993–1994. During this season, Victoria Hotspurs also won the Super Cup, yet lost the final of the GFA Cup to Ghajnsielem F.C. after the penalty shootout. During the season 1995–1996, Victoria Hotspurs won again the Super Cup after winning 1–0 against Nadur Youngsters, with Sabri Rais scoring after extra time. Rais was again decisive when he scored four goals in the final of the GFA Cup during season 1996–1997 against Xaghra United. This was the first and the only GFA Cup Victoria Hotspurs won so far. During this season, Victoria Hotspurs won again the Super Cup and the Republic Cup. Victoria Hotspurs player Dione Lautier won the Gozo Football Player of the year award.

The New Millennium

Victoria Hotspurs reached their tenth League Championship in season 1999–2000. Dominic Grech was back at the club as coach.  During this season, Victoria Hotspurs won again the Super Cup and the Millennium Cup after beating Zebbug Rangers 2–1, with Michael Vella scoring the golden goal. Victoria Hotspurs was the first Gozitan team to reach the tenth League Championship. Hotspurs player Reuben Mercieca won the Gozo Football player of the year.

Victoria Hotspurs suffered relegation from the Gozo First division in season 2004–2005 and bounced back two years after.
After absence of a few years, Victoria Hotspurs were back as champions of the Gozo Football league in season 2009–2010. Under the guidelines of ex-player Christopher Buttigieg, Victoria Hotspurs won the League Championship for the eleventh time together with the Super Cup, the Freedom Cup and Independence Cup. Victoria Hotspurs player John Paul Grima won the Gozo Football player of the year.

The Seventieth Anniversary
The season 2017–2018 marked the seventieth anniversary of Victoria Hotspurs. With Dr. Anton Tabone back as President, and after an absence of eight years, Victoria Hotspurs were back as League champions for the twelfth time with a record total of points. Ex-player Gotthard Conti was back at the club, this time as Coach. Victoria Hotspurs also won the First Division knock out after defeating Ghajnsielem 3–1. Victoria Hotspurs player Christian Mercieca won the Gozo Football player of the year award.

Victoria Hotspurs won their 13th League Championship in season 2018–2019, the GFA Super Cup and after a 22-year absence the BOV GFA Cup after beating Nadur Youngsters FC 3–2. 
Team captain, Ferdinando Apap won the Gozo Football player of the year award.

On 22 August 2019, Victoria Hotspurs played a friendly match against Italian Serie C squad Calcio Catania at the Stadio Torre Del Grifo, Catania. The Italians won the game 2–3, Elton Silva scoring both goals for the Hotspurs. This match was the first match ever in Victoria Hotspurs FC’s 71-year old history against a foreign professional side abroad.

Honours

Gozo First Division: 13
1961–62, 1962–63, 1964–65, 1965–66, 1966–67, 1979–80, 1984–85, 1990–91, 1993–94, 1999–00, 2009–10, 2017–18, 2018–19
Gozo Second Division: 2
1958–59, 2006–07
BOV Super Cup: 9
1989–90, 1990–91, 1991–92, 1993–94, 1995–96, 1996–97, 1999–00, 2009–10, 2018–19
Esso Cup: 3
1963–64, 1965–66, 1966–67
Republic Cup: 2	
1980–81, 1996–97
Civil Council Cup: 1
1971–72
Galea Cup: 3
1948–49, 1962–63, 1968–69
Independence Cup 	
1964–65, 1997–98, 2008–09, 2009–10
Dingli Cup 	
1958–59
Millenium Cup 	
1999–00
GFA Cup: 2	
1996–97, 2018–19
Gozo First Division KO 	
2017–18
Second Division Knock-Out: 1
2006–07
Freedom Day Cup 	
2007–08, 2009–2010
Good Conduct Cup: 1
1972–73
Tapie 2nd Div. Cup: 1
1958–59
Premier Knock–out: 1
1997–98
MG 2nd Knock–out: 1	
1958–59

Current squad

External links

References

Football clubs in Malta
Gozitan football clubs
1948 establishments in Malta
Victoria, Gozo
Association football clubs established in 1948